6-Methylenedihydrodesoxymorphine (6-MDDM) is an opiate analogue structurally related to desomorphine that is a derivative of hydromorphone, where the 6-ketone group has been replaced by a methylene group. It has sedative and analgesic effects.

6-Methylenedihydrodesoxymorphine is a potent μ-opioid agonist, 80x stronger than morphine. Compared to morphine it has a faster onset of action and similar duration of effects. It produces around the same degree of respiratory depression as morphine, but less inhibition of gastrointestinal motility. Animal studies show it to be a potent analgesic which produces significant analgesic effects even at low doses while inducing comparatively few side effects, however it has never been developed for medical use in humans.

6-Methylenedihydrodesoxymorphine is synthesised in two steps; first a Wittig reaction is used, reacting hydrocodone with methylenetriphenylphosphorane and an alkyl lithium reagent in diethyl ether to form 6-Methylenedihydrodesoxycodeine. The 3-methoxy group is then cleaved to hydroxy, by reaction with pyridine. The second step tends to be incomplete and often gives fairly low yields, but these can be improved by changing the reaction conditions.

See also
 Desomorphine
 Methyldesorphine
 Nalmefene
 Xorphanol

References 

4,5-Epoxymorphinans
Mu-opioid receptor agonists
Phenols
Semisynthetic opioids